Blenheim is a small area of inner-city Leeds, West Yorkshire, England. It is situated north of the city centre between Little London, Lovell Park and Woodhouse and is generally made of early 20th century terraced housing. Blenheim falls within the Hyde Park and Woodhouse ward of Leeds City Council.

The Georgian/Victorian Blenheim Square is a Conservation Area.

References

Places in Leeds